Odapalli is a village in Namakkal district of Tamil Nadu, India.  census, it had a population of 4578.

References

Cities and towns in Namakkal district